National Highway 753, commonly referred to as NH-753 is a Major Highway in Maharashtra, India.
It connected with Major Cities as Savner, Tumsar,Tirora, Gondia, Arjuni Morgaon and Others Villages Goregaon, Gondia, Sadak Arjuni and one of Important National Park Navegaon National Park which is Famous Tourists Attractions for Peoples in India.

Route 
NH-753 connects Arjuni Morgaon, Navegaon National Park, Kohmara, Goregaon, Gondia, Gondia, Tirora , Tumsar, Ramtek and Saoner in the state of Maharashtra.

Junctions  

  near Mansar.
  near Savner.
  near Kohmara.
  near Ramtek.
  near Gondia.

See also 

 List of National Highways in India
 List of National Highways in India by state

References

External links 

 NH 753 on OpenStreetMap

National highways in India
National Highways in Maharashtra